Berdugo is a surname. People with that name include:

 Diego Dionisio de Peñalosa Briceño y Berdugo (1621–1687), governor of Spanish New Mexico 
 Fulgencio Berdugo (1918-2003), Colombian footballer
 Gabriel Berdugo (born 1947), Colombian footballer
 Raphael Berdugo (1747-1821), Moroccan rabbi
 Salomon Berdugo (1854–1906), Moroccan rabbi
 Serge Berdugo (born 1938), Moroccan lawyer and politician

See also